Harold (Hal) Slager is a member of the Indiana House of Representatives. He is a CPA by profession. Slager was elected to the Indiana House in 2012. He previously served on the Schererville Town Council from 2003 to 2012. He was educated at Butler University. Slager is a Roman Catholic.

References

External links
Indian government bio of Slager

Living people
Republican Party members of the Indiana House of Representatives
Butler University alumni
Year of birth missing (living people)
People from Schererville, Indiana
21st-century American politicians